Philippe Taquet (b. April 25, 1940 Saint-Quentin, Aisne) is a French paleontologist who specializes in dinosaur systematics of finds primarily in northern Africa.

He is a member of the French Academy of Sciences since November 30, 2004, president since 2012. He has studied and described a number of new dinosaur species from Africa, especially from the Aptian site of Gadoufaoua in Niger (such as Ouranosaurus).  He also researches the Lower Cretaceous stratigraphic relationship between western Africa and Brazil by reconstructing the paleobiology from fossil floras and faunas.  He was president of the French National Museum of Natural History from 1985 to 1990.

He received the Sue Tyler Friedman Medal in 2009 for work in the history of geology.

References

French paleontologists
1940 births
Living people
 
People from Saint-Quentin, Aisne
Members of the French Academy of Sciences
National Museum of Natural History (France) people